Gabrielle Wang is an Australian writer and illustrator for children and young adults based in Melbourne. Her writing career spans 20 years and has produced more than 20 books.

Biography 

Wang was born in Melbourne and is a fourth generation Australian, her ancestors having come to Australia during the Australian gold rushes of the mid-1800s. Wang trained as a graphic designer in Melbourne, then studied painting and language in Taiwan and China. She lectured in Chinese at RMIT University in Melbourne before writing full time. Her work is influenced by her experiences of growing up between two cultures.

Wang's children's novel, A Ghost in my Suitcase, was adapted for the stage by Vanessa Bates of Barking Gecko Theatre and toured in 2019.

In March 2022 she was named the Australian Children's Laureate for 2022–2023.

Bibliography 
 'The Garden of Empress Cassia' Penguin Australia (2002)
 'The Pearl of Tiger Bay' Penguin Australia (2004)
 'Kids Night In 2' Penguin Australia (2005)
 'The Hidden Monastery' Puffin Books (2006)
 'The Lion Drummer' Puffin Books (2008)
 'A Ghost in my Suitcase' Penguin Australia (2009)
 'Little Paradise' Puffin Books (2010)
 'The Race for the Chinese Zodiac' Black Dog Books (2012)
 'Poppy Comes Home' Bk 4 Puffin Books (2011)
 'Poppy and the Thief' Bk 3 Puffin Books (2011)
 'Poppy at Summerhill' Bk 2 Puffin Books (2011)
 'Meet Poppy' Bk1 Puffin Books (2011)
 'The Wishbird' Penguin Australia (2013)
 'Pearlie's Ghost' Bk 4 Penguin Australia (2014)
 'Pearlie the Spy' Bk 3 Penguin Australia (2014)
 'Pearlie's Pet Rescue' Bk 2 Penguin Australia (2014)
 'Meet Pearlie' Bk 1 Penguin Australia (2014)
 'The Poppy Stories (4 books in 1) Penguin Australia (2016)
 'Two Enchanted Tales from Old China' Christmas Press (2017)
 'The Beast of Hushing Wood' Penguin Australia (2017)
 'The Pearlie Stories' (4 books in 1) Penguin RH (2018)
 'Ting Ting the Ghost Hunter' Penguin RH (2018)
 'Zadie Ma and the Dog Who Chased the Moon' Penguin RH (2022)

Awards 
The Garden of Empress Cassia
Shortlisted for the Aurealis Awards 2002 Best Children's (8-12y) Long Fiction
The Pearl of Tiger Bay
Shortlisted for the Aurealis Awards 2004 Best Children's (8-12y) Long Fiction
The Lion Drummer
Children's Book Council of Australia Book of the Year Awards 2009 - Notable Book
A Ghost in my Suitcase
Shortlisted for the 2011 Sakura Medal
Children's Book Council of Australia Book of the Year Awards 2010 - Notable Book
Shortlisted for the Aurealis Awards 2009 Best Children's (8-12y) Long Fiction
The Race for the Chinese Zodiac
Shortlisted for the WAYRBA, YABBA, KOALA Awards 2011
Our Australian Girl: Meet Poppy
Shortlisted for the YABBA, Kroc, COOL, KOALA Awards 2012
Shortlisted in the 2012 WAYRBA Awards
The Wishbird
Children's Book Council of Australia Book of the Year Awards 2014 - Notable Book
Shortlisted for the Australian Book Design Awards 2014
Shortlisted for the YABBA, Kroc, KOALA Awards 2014
Shortlisted for the Crystal Kite Award 2014
The Beast of Hushing Wood
Shortlisted for the Speech Pathology Awards 2018
Ting Ting the Ghosthunter
Shortlisted for the Aurealis Awards 2018 Best Long Children's Fiction

References 

21st-century Australian writers
Year of birth missing (living people)
Living people
Australian people of Chinese descent
Australian children's book illustrators